Booth Colman (March 8, 1923 – December 15, 2014) was an American film, television and stage actor. In his later years he played older authority figures, such as doctors and lawyers. Colman appeared in films since 1952, when he debuted (uncredited) in The Big Sky directed by Howard Hawks.

Life and career
Colman was born in Portland, Oregon. As a child actor in local productions, he became active in local radio. He studied Oriental language at the University of Washington and University of Michigan. During World War II, he enlisted in the United States Army on May 12, 1943, and attended language training at the University of Michigan from 1943 to 1944. After language training, he worked in New York City and was discharged from the army in 1944 at Fort Dix, New Jersey. While in New York, he began a long career in Broadway theater, first appearing in a production of Irwin Shaw's war drama The Assassin. He was soon invited to join Maurice Evans' acting company, where he continued to act on stage, and later in films. His other Broadway credits include Now I Lay Me Down to Sleep (1950), Tonight at 8:30 (1948), and Hamlet (1945).

He appeared dozens of times on prime-time television dramas and comedies. In 1964, he appeared in two full episodes of Perry Mason, one as a doctor in police investigations and the other as a prosecuting attorney. Other televisions appearances include My Three Sons (1962), Frasier, Gilligan's Island, McCloud and The Monkees. Films include Them! (1954), The Silver Chalice (1954), Moonfleet (1955), My Gun Is Quick (1957), Wild on the Beach (1965), Maryjane (1968), The Lawyer (1970), Scandalous John (1971), Time Travelers (1976), Norma Rae (1979) and Intolerable Cruelty (2003). In 1983, he portrayed the kindly scientist, Professor Hector Jerrold, in the ABC daytime melodrama General Hospital.

In 1974, Colman played the role of Dr. Zaius in the popular short-lived TV series, Planet of the Apes; the role made famous on the big screen by his former teacher, Maurice Evans. In the six episodes in which he appeared, he wore the original costume Evans used in Planet of the Apes and Beneath the Planet of the Apes.

Colman played Scrooge over 600 times on stage in A Christmas Carol at the Meadow Brook Theatre in the Detroit area. He died in his sleep in Los Angeles at the age of 91 on December 15, 2014.

Filmography

Film

Television

References

External links
 
 
 
 Obituary - Los Angeles Times

1923 births
2014 deaths
American male stage actors
American male film actors
American male television actors
University of Michigan alumni
20th-century American male actors
Male actors from Portland, Oregon
University of Washington alumni
21st-century American male actors
United States Army soldiers